Cronobacter muytjensii is a bacterium. It is named after Harry Muytjens. Its type strain is ATCC 51329T (=CIP 103581T). It is indole, dulcitol, and malonate positive but palatinose and methyl-α-D-glucopyranoside negative.

References

Further reading

External links 
LPSN

Type strain of Cronobacter muytjensii at BacDive -  the Bacterial Diversity Metadatabase

Enterobacteriaceae
Bacteria described in 2007